The following Union Army units and commanders fought in the Battle of Richmond of the American Civil War. The Confederate order of battle is listed separately.

Abbreviations used

Military rank
 MG = Major General
 BG = Brigadier General
 Col = Colonel
 Ltc = Lieutenant Colonel
 Maj = Major
 Cpt = Captain
 Lt = 1st Lieutenant

Other
 w = wounded
 mw = mortally wounded
 k = killed
 c = captured

Army of Kentucky

MG William "Bull" Nelson (w)
BG Mahlon Dickerson Manson (in command until Nelson's arrival)

See also

 Kentucky in the American Civil War

References
 Lambert, D. Warren.  "When the Ripe Pears Fell:  The Battle of Richmond, Kentucky" (Richmond, KY:  Madison County Historical Society, Inc.), 1996.  

American Civil War orders of battle